Grudnica is a small dispersed settlement in the hills above the valley of the Idrijca River in the Municipality of Tolmin in the Littoral region of Slovenia.

References

External links 
Grudnica on Geopedia

Populated places in the Municipality of Tolmin